Paryadin Ridge is a ridge extending from Cape Alexandra to Cape Paryadin at the west end of South Georgia. The name "Paryadin-Kamm," derived from nearby Cape Paryadin, was given by Ludwig Kohl-Larsen during his visit to South Georgia in 1928–29. An English form of the name has been approved.

Hesse Peak is the highest peak on Paryadin Ridge.

References

Ridges of Antarctica